Evdokia or (informally) Avdotia Ilyinichna Istomina (1799–1848) was the most celebrated Russian Empire ballerina of the 19th century.

Biography 
She was orphaned at a young age, but was accepted into the Imperial Theater School, where children could live in complete security.

A pupil of Charles Didelot, she debuted in the Imperial Russian Ballet in 1815 to immediate acclaim. Several people were killed duelling for her heart, and her honour was defended in the fourfold duel (1817): Count Zavadovsky killed Count Sheremetev, while the Decembrist Yakubovich shot through a palm of the playwright Alexander Griboedov. Her dancing is the subject of a brilliant stanza in Eugene Onegin, which was described by Vladimir Nabokov as the most mellifluous lines in the whole of Russian poetry.

She danced nearly all of the principal roles in ballets by Didelot. She became the first Russian dancer en pointe. She served in the Imperial Ballet for twenty years. She married a young actor, but he soon died. Late in life she remarried, this time to the dramatic actor Pavel Ekunin (ru: Павел Семенович Экунин). By this time she was no longer performing leading roles and her income was reduced by half. In the 1835/1836 season, she was injured during the performance and was asked to leave for treatment. Emperor Nicholas I of Russia saw this request and wrote the order: to be dismissed. On 30 January 1836 Avdotya Istomina came on stage one last time and danced a little Russian dance.

She died of cholera on 26 June 26 (8 July) in 1848 in St. Petersburg. No one could remember her as a famous ballerina. The inscription on her tomb: "Avdotya Ilyinichna Ekunina, a retired actress".

See also

 List of Russian ballet dancers

References

Prima ballerinas
Ballerinas from the Russian Empire
1799 births
1848 deaths
19th-century ballet dancers from the Russian Empire